Borowik may refer to:

 Borowik, West Pomeranian Voivodeship, Poland
 Irena Borowik (born 1956), Polish publisher and professor of religious studies
 Wojciech Borowik (1956–2020), Polish politician

See also

 Borowiki, Podlaskie Voivodeship, Poland
 Borówki, Podkarpackie Voivodeship, Poland
 Borovik (disambiguation)